Taghaser is a village in the Khojavend District of Azerbaijan, in the disputed region of Nagorno-Karabakh. The village is located close to the town of Hadrut. The village had an ethnic Armenian-majority population prior to the 2020 Nagorno-Karabakh war, and also had an Armenian majority in 1989.

Toponymy 
The name Taghaser derives from two Armenian words, Tagh, meaning quarter (of a city), and Ser, meaning vertex.

History 
During the Soviet period, the village was part of the Hadrut District of the Nagorno-Karabakh Autonomous Oblast. After the First Nagorno-Karabakh War, the village was administrated as part of the Hadrut Province of the breakaway Republic of Artsakh. The village came under the control of Azerbaijan on 14 October 2020, during the 2020 Nagorno-Karabakh war.

Historical heritage sites 
Historical heritage sites in and around the village include a 14th/15th-century khachkar, the church of Taghaseri Anapat built in 1635, the bridge of Hin Taghaser built in 1763, the 17th-century church of Surb Astvatsatsin, the 17th-century village of Hin Shen, a cemetery from between the 17th and 19th centuries, and a 20th-century spring monument.

Demographics 
The village had 491 inhabitants in 2005, and 434 inhabitants in 2015.

Gallery

References

External links 

 

Populated places in Khojavend District
Nagorno-Karabakh
Former Armenian inhabited settlements